A statue of Yasuhito, Prince Chichibu wearing a rugby uniform is installed outside Chichibunomiya Rugby Stadium, in Tokyo, Japan.

References

External links
 

Monuments and memorials in Japan
Outdoor sculptures in Tokyo
Sculptures of men in Japan
Sculptures of sports
Statues in Japan
Minato, Tokyo